Shane McGregor (born 5 December 1963) is a retired South African football player who played professionally for Grinaker Rangers, Kaizer Chiefs, Pretoria City F.C. and Supersport United. He scored over 20 goals four times in a season in 1986, 1987, 1991 and 1992.

Grinaker Rangers
"Makentane" (Chains) turned professional at age 21 where he bought his first car, Ford Escort 1600 earning R250 a month. He helped the "Black and Whites" win the 1986 1986 National Soccer League by scoring 27 goals in 39 matches.

Kaizer Chiefs

1988 season
He was the NSL top goalscorer with 19 goals. He was voted 1989 Footballer of the Year and Players' Player of the Season.

1990/1991 season
He scored 25 goals in 38 matches when they won the treble.

1992 season
Fani Madida and Shane McGregor were both signed in 1987 and made their presence felt in 1992 where their deadly combination produced 54 goals. Madida with a record of 34 strikes in 42 and McGregor with 20 when they won the double.

International career
At the age of 29 in an African Cup of Nations qualifier against Zimbabwe, McGregor played his one and only international match due to an argument with coach Stanley Tshabalala about his demands, and style of play, which led to a fallout with his international career.

Pretoria City
Pretoria City (now Supersport United) was McGregor's last club where he retired at the age of 34.

Style of play
Kickoff website described MacGregor as a player that did "good work off the ball, he could get into the area, find space and do damage".

After retirement

Coaching career
He was made general manager at Supersport United after being a player-coach. He has worked as assistant coach at Mamelodi Sundowns, he was also caretaker coach for seven matches after the departure of Ted Dumitru. He lost the BP Top 8 final and was heavily criticised. He was fired by Anastasia Tsichlas who owned the club before Patrice Motsepe.

Television
Supersport United, which is owned by a group of television channels (Supersport), handed him a job at TellyTrack giving betting tips in different sport codes.

Honours
NSL: 1989, 1991, 1992
BP Top 8: 1987, 1989, 1991, 1992, 1994
JPS Knockout Cup: 1988, 1989
Mainstay Cup: 1987, 1992 
Iwisa Spectacular: 1986, 1987, 1988, 1989, 1990
Ohlsson's Challenge: 1987, 1989
Castle Challenge: 1990, 1991
Panasonic Cup: 1986

References

1963 births
Living people
Soccer players from Johannesburg
Association football forwards
Kaizer Chiefs F.C. players
SuperSport United F.C. players
South African soccer players
South Africa international soccer players
South African people of Scottish descent